William Lamont Strothers (born May 10, 1968) is a retired American professional basketball player. Born in Nansemond County, Virginia Strothers played college basketball for Christopher Newport. He was selected in the 1991 NBA draft and had short stints in the NBA with the Portland Trail Blazers and the Dallas Mavericks. He played in CBA, but he spent most of his professional career overseas. After retiring from professional basketball, he took coaching positions in high school basketball teams.

Early life
Born in Nansemond County, Virginia, Strothers' parents Calvin and Brenda separated when he was three years old. His mother was later remarried to a supportive military man when he was five. His brother, Calvin Jr., played football and basketball at New Hampshire. Later he joined the military where he was selected to play on their elite basketball team as a power forward.

Amateur career
Strothers was a shooter for the Forest Glen high school varsity in Suffolk, Virginia. As a senior in 1986, his vision was impaired after being struck in the left eye by brass knuckles in a fistfight. After a year, Strothers was barred from signing up for the military because of his impaired vision. He then worked at a meatpacking plant and played in recreational leagues. Strothers turned down a partial scholarship offer from Georgia because of difficulty paying half the tuition. While playing in a recreational league, Strothers was offered a spot on the team at Christopher Newport University by assistant basketball coach Roland Ross. Strothers played four years at Christopher Newport University from 1987 to 1991, scoring 2,709 points for an average of 23.3 points per game. For leading his team to a 21–4 record en route to the Dixie Conference championship, he was named first-team All-American and Division III Player of the Year by Basketball Times in 1991. Strothers finished his collegiate career as the third-all-time-leading scorer in Division III history.

Professional career
In the 1991 NBA draft, the Golden State Warriors drafted him in the 2nd round—43rd overall—making him the highest-ever draft pick for an NCAA Division III player. He was subsequently traded to the Portland Trail Blazers. He spent parts of two seasons with Portland and the Dallas Mavericks, amassing an NBA career average of 4.6 points per game in a total of 13 games.

Strothers played most of his career overseas and enjoyed success in the Philippines as an import for the San Miguel Beermen from 1996 to 2002. He was voted Best Import in the 1999 PBA Governors Cup and led the team to championship. He also led his sixth-seeded team to the 2000 Governor's Cup title. Strothers finished his PBA career with over 3,900 points.

Coaching career
Strothers, in 2006–07, was the head coach of a 15–8 team at Bethel High School, Virginia. In 2010, he was part of the USA South Conference inaugural Hall of Fame class. Strothers was part of the CNU Captains' run to the Final Four as an assistant to Carolyn Hunter during the 2010–11 season. In August 2011, he was hired as head boys' varsity basketball coach at Warwick High School in Newport News, Virginia. Replacing longtime coach Ben Moore in 2011–12, his team went 1–20 overall and 0–18 in the Peninsula District in his first season. The next year, his Raiders 8–15, 5–13. In March 2013, Strothers announced he was leaving Warwick.

In 2015, Strothers was coach of the Nansemond-Suffolk Academy boys' basketball team.

In 2017, Strothers was named coach of the Smithfield High School boys' basketball team.

In 2018, after the death of coach Benjamin Moore, who was a close family friend and father-like figure, Strothers took over the basketball program at Menchville High School.

References

External links 
Stats at basketballreference.com

1968 births
Living people
African-American basketball players
American expatriate basketball people in France
American expatriate basketball people in Greece
American expatriate basketball people in Israel
American expatriate basketball people in Spain
American expatriate basketball people in the Philippines
American expatriate basketball people in Turkey
Basketball players from Virginia
Christopher Newport Captains men's basketball players
Dallas Mavericks players
Darüşşafaka Basketbol players
Golden State Warriors draft picks
Iraklis Thessaloniki B.C. players
Liga ACB players
Philippine Basketball Association imports
Portland Trail Blazers players
Quad City Thunder players
Rochester Renegade players
Rockford Lightning players
San Miguel Beermen players
Shooting guards
Tri-City Chinook players
Yakima Sun Kings players
Sportspeople from Suffolk, Virginia
American men's basketball players
21st-century African-American people
20th-century African-American sportspeople